The Arrows A5 was the car which the Arrows Formula One team used to compete in the 1982 Formula One season. The A5 appeared late in the season, and was primarily a development car, with the lessons learned to be applied to the A6 for the upcoming 1983 Formula One season.

Complete Formula One results
(key)

 All points scored with the Arrows A4

References

A05